Celebrity Big Brother, also known as Big Brother: Celebrity Edition, is the American adaptation of the reality competition television franchise Celebrity Big Brother, which was created by John de Mol. The series premiered on CBS as counterprogramming to NBC's coverage of the 2018 Winter Olympics on February 7, 2018. The series has aired for two seasons and focuses on a group of celebrities, known as HouseGuests, that live in a purpose-built house, known as the Big Brother house, with no contact from the outside world for approximately a month. The HouseGuests try to avoid eviction with the aim of being the last remaining HouseGuest in order to win a grand prize of $250,000. Allison Grodner and Rich Meehan (Lim Jahey) serve as executive producers and the show is produced by Fly on the Wall Entertainment in association with Endemol Shine North America. Julie Chen Moonves hosts the series, continuing a position she has held since Big Brother premiered on CBS in 2000. It is filmed in Los Angeles.

Each season consists of thirteen episodes airing over a span of two and a half weeks. All episodes are approximately 44 to 82 minutes, excluding commercials, and are broadcast in both high-definition and standard. Episodes are also available for download at the iTunes Store in standard and high definition and Amazon Video, with new episodes appearing the day after their live airings. Recent episodes are available at CBS' official Celebrity Big Brother website and the CBS App for a limited amount of time. All episodes are available on CBS All Access along with the live Internet feed allowing subscribers to watch the HouseGuests while a season is in progress. Celebrity Big Brother: After Dark is a companion show that airs on Pop concurrent with each season. After Dark provides viewers the opportunity to watch the HouseGuests live for three hours per day. In order to preserve the drama for television broadcasts, CBS does not webcast certain moments that transpire in the house, including competitions and the nomination and eviction process.

Series overview

Episodes

Season 1 (2018)

Season 2 (2019)

Season 3 (2022)

Ratings

References

General

Specific 

 
Celebrity Big Brother
Lists of American reality television series episodes